Grant Park refers to the oldest city park in Atlanta, Georgia, United States, as well as the Victorian neighborhood surrounding it.

Park
Grant Park is a 131-acre green space and recreational area and is the fourth-largest park in the city, behind Chastain Park, Freedom Park and Piedmont Park. Zoo Atlanta, established in 1889 and originally known as the Grant Park Zoo, is located in the park and attracts more than 1 million visitors annually.

History

Grant Park was established in 1883 when Lemuel P. Grant, a successful engineer and businessman, gave the city of Atlanta  in the newly developed "suburb" where he lived. In 1890, the city acquired another  for the park and appointed its first park commissioner, Sidney Root. In 1903, the Olmsted Brothers (sons of Frederick Law Olmsted)  were hired to create a plan for the park.  The original park included a lake, named Lake Abana, to handle storm-water runoff.

A failed circus gave birth to the eventual Zoo Atlanta when local lumber merchant George Gress purchased animals from the circus and donated them to the city in 1889. The city decided Grant Park was the best location for the zoo and carved space out for the attraction. Later zoo expansions and parking requirements caused the removal of a portion of the lake. In 1892, the circular painting of the Battle of Atlanta was exhibited in the park. The cyclorama would eventually gain its own dedicated building in the park in 1921. Near the zoo is the Erskine Memorial Fountain, Atlanta's first public fountain, which was built in 1896 and moved to Grant Park in 1912. In 1948, another park landmark, the Thomas W. Talbot Monument, was dedicated by members of the International Association of Machinists, honoring their founder, Thomas W. Talbot.

In 1996, after years of neglect and abuse, the City of Atlanta Parks Bureau commissioned a new master plan for the park. The consultants working on the plan met with a citizen advisory group that would eventually become the Grant Park Conservancy. The Conservancy works to raise funds to enhance and protect the park for the enjoyment of all its visitors.

Neighborhood

Grant Park, the intown neighborhood surrounding the park, is one of Atlanta's oldest and most important historic districts, listed on the NRHP. It is bordered by the Cabbagetown neighborhood on the north, Ormewood Park on the east, Boulevard Heights on the southeast, Chosewood Park on the south, and Summerhill and Peoplestown on the west.

It includes the park, 48 acres or 35 hectares of Oakland Cemetery (established 1850), where Margaret Mitchell, Bobby Jones, 25 former mayors of Atlanta, six former governors of Georgia, and many Civil War dead are buried.  It also includes the Atlanta Stockade; Fort Walker; and the 1858 mansion of Lemuel P. Grant, for whom the park and neighborhood were named. The mansion is the second-oldest house still standing on its original location in Atlanta. The Grant Park Neighborhood Association represents local residents.

Together with Inman Park, Grant Park contains the largest remaining area of Victorian architecture in Atlanta. Most buildings were built between the neighborhood's founding in 1882 and the first decades of the 20th century. Large two-story mansions face the park, more modest two-story, modified Queen Anne houses were built on surrounding streets, and one-story Victorian era cottages and Craftsman bungalows were built to the east of the park.

The neighborhood is home to St. Paul United Methodist Church, which for a time in the early 1900s had the largest Methodist congregation in the Southeast. St. Paul is well known for its beautiful stained glass windows and an organ that was acquired in 1887. Each December, St. Paul, the Grant Park Cooperative Preschool (which is located on the first floor of St. Paul), and the Grant Park Parent Network host the Grant Park Candlelight Tour of Homes and Artist Market. There is also a Tour of Homes in the autumn sponsored by the Grant Park Neighborhood Association.

References

External links 

Grant Park Neighborhood Association
Grant Park Conservancy
Historic Oakland Foundation
Zoo Atlanta
Grant Park Summer Shade Festival

Parks in Atlanta
Historic districts on the National Register of Historic Places in Georgia (U.S. state)
Neighborhoods in Atlanta
Bungalow architecture in Georgia (U.S. state)
Italianate architecture in Georgia (U.S. state)
Queen Anne architecture in Georgia (U.S. state)
National Register of Historic Places in Atlanta